Larry Coughlan (1941 in Geashill, County Offaly - 13 September 2009) was an Irish Gaelic footballer who played for his local club Raheen, Eadestown in Kildare and Courtwood in Laois, as well as at senior level for the Offaly county team from 1960 until 1973.

Coughlan had a lengthy career with Offaly, first coming to notice as a sub on the first Offaly team to win the Leinster Senior Football Championship in 1960. He was only 19 at the time. He progressed to win All-Ireland Senior Football Championship medals in 1971 and 1972 when Offaly beat Galway and Kerry. He didn't play in the 1971 final but did win a medal as a substitute and was a key figure at left corner back in the following year's success.

References

1941 births
2009 deaths
Courtwood Gaelic footballers
Offaly inter-county Gaelic footballers